Deltona is the most populous city in Volusia County, Florida, United States. It is located on the northern shore of Lake Monroe along the St. Johns River in central Florida. As of the 2020 census, the city population was 93,692. The city is part of the Deltona–Daytona Beach–Ormond Beach, Florida metropolitan statistical area, which is grouped with the larger Orlando–Lakeland–Deltona, Florida combined statistical area.

The city, previously known as Deltona Lakes, was originally established as a planned residential community, and was master-planned and developed by the General Development Corporation and the Mackle Brothers. Since its opening in 1962, the community rapidly grew from a small subdivision to becoming one of largest cities in Central Florida by the end of the 20th century, largely in part by the Mackle Brothers' worldwide marketing efforts showcasing small low maintenance homes offered at affordable prices. The city is mostly residential, and primarily serves as a commuter town for the nearby cities of Orlando and Daytona Beach, as well as its surrounding communities.

History 
The area of current Deltona and surrounding communities was originally inhabited by nomadic Timucuans, who found fish and fresh water to be plentiful in the area. After Florida became a state in 1845, steamboats began to make regular trips up the St. Johns River to Lake Monroe. George Sauls, a former secret agent for the Confederacy during the American Civil War, along with his wife Adeline and six children, were the first settlers in the area in 1859. Sauls' homestead caught fire in 1972, but it would eventually be designated as a historical site by the Volusia County Historical Commission, and the street, originally named Barranca, was renamed George Sauls Street in 1977. It was decommissioned as a historical site in 2000, and its site marker has since been relocated to the nearby Osteen Cemetery, with maintenance overseen by the Volusia County Preservation Board.

What now constitutes the city was originally developed in 1962 as Deltona Lakes by Elliott, Robert and Frank Mackle as a planned residential community through the purchase of 17,203 acres of land. The development would open to potential land buyers on November 18, 1962, and included out-parcels for drainage retention, apartments, churches, parks, commercial centers, an industrial area, a community center, and a golf course. Deltona Lakes was heavily marketed throughout the United States, including Ohio, Illinois, Indiana and Michigan. Sales representatives would also market in places such as Germany, Puerto Rico, Latin America and the Far East.

By November 1965, just one year after its opening, Deltona Lakes grew to a population of nearly 1,600, nearly 1,000 homes were built or under construction, and had more than 120 miles of paved roads or roads being surfaced. By September 1966, Deltona Lakes came to attract more families, growing to a population of 2,413, and a student enrollment of more than 200, resulting in soaring property sales of up to US$60 million. In April 1967, more than 30 civic, social, charitable and fraternal clubs would form, including a civic association, a men's and women's golf association, a shuffle board club, and a bicycle club. By 1970, Deltona Lakes had an estimated population of 4,868 and would continue to grow in population throughout the 1970s and 1980s, reaching a population of 51,828 by 1990. 

The residents of Deltona Lakes attempted to incorporate it as a city in 1987 and 1990, but were not successful until 1995. A city charter was adopted on September 9, 1995, and a seven-member city commission was elected. Deltona Lakes was incorporated as a city on December 31, 1995, with its name shortened to Deltona.

The city grew to a population of 69,543 people by the 2000 census, becoming the most populous city in Volusia County. After the city's incorporation, regular city meetings would be held on the second floor of the now-defunct SouthTrust Bank building on Deltona Boulevard, until the first city hall began construction in 2001. The US$7 million project would complete for opening on March 16, 2002. On December 3, 2002, ground broke for the development of the Deltona satellite campus of Daytona State College (then known as Daytona Beach Community College), adjacent to Deltona City Hall. The campus opened in August 2004.

Throughout the 2000s, the city would continue to grow in population, while maintaining a mainly residential landscape. As of the 2010 census, Deltona had a population of 85,182. In recent years, new measures have been taken by city officials to begin attracting new businesses and industries into the city. Specially zoned areas in the city have been designated to allow for the development of upscale office facilities, light industrial space, health care facilities, warehousing and distribution facilities, commercial recreational facilities, and lodging services. 

In 2011, the city's first movie theater opened. In August 2013, Bethune-Cookman University (based in Daytona Beach) opened a satellite campus in Deltona on Saxon Boulevard. Halifax Health opened the city's first emergency department facility on Howland Boulevard in April 2017. In December 2019, Amazon announced the location of a new distribution center in Deltona to open in November 2020.

Geography and climate 
It is bordered by Lake Helen and Cassadaga on the north, DeLand on the northwest, Orange City on the west, DeBary on the southwest, Enterprise on the south, and Osteen on the southeast. It is included in the Deltona–Daytona Beach–Ormond Beach Metropolitan Statistical Area and the larger Orlando–Lakeland–Deltona Combined Statistical Area.

The majority of the land in the city is of karst topography, characterized by rolling hills and an abundant amount of lakes. The St. Johns River passes through Lake Monroe, directly south of the city.

Deltona's climate is classified as a humid subtropical climate in the Cfa Köppen climate classification, meaning it typically has hot, humid summers and mild winters. The record high temperature is  recorded in July 1998, with a record low of  recorded in January 1985. Rainfall averages around  a year, with the wettest months being June through September. The hurricane season lasts from June 1 to November 30, with September as the most susceptible month to hurricanes. The most powerful hurricane to strike Deltona since its incorporation was Charley in 2004, during which the eye of the hurricane passed directly over the city; that same year, the city would also suffer from the effects of hurricanes Frances and Jeanne.

Demographics 

As of the 2010 U.S. Census, there were 85,182 people residing within the city. , there were 34,089 households, out of which 11.3% were vacant. In 2000, 32.8% had children under the age of 18 living with them, 55% were married couples living together, 15.3% had a female householder with no husband present, and 23.7% were non-families. Of all households, 38.3% were made up of individuals, and 26.6% had someone living alone who was 65 years of age or older.

As of 2000, the median income for a household in the city was $50,058. Males had a median income of $34,478 versus $27,230 for females. The per capita income for the city was $21,019. About 11.1% of the population were below the poverty line.

The 2010 U.S. Census data indicated that 30.2% of the city's population were Hispanic or Latino. The majority of Hispanic residents in Deltona were Puerto Rican, and made up 20.7% of the population. 1.8% of the population were Cuban, 1.6% of the population were Mexican, 1.5% of the population were Dominican, and 4.6% of the population were of other Hispanic or Latino origin, .

As of 2000, English spoken as a first language accounted for 81.39% of all residents, while 18.60% spoke other languages as their mother tongue. The most significant were Spanish speakers who made up 15.85% of the population, while Italian came up as the third most spoken language, which made up 0.71%, and French was at fourth, with 0.58% of the population.

Government and infrastructure 
Deltona operates under a commission–manager form of government, consisting of seven elected officials, and an appointed city manager. Residents elect, through non-partisan elections, a mayor who represents the city at-large and six commission members who each represent a specific district of the community. Elected officials serve four-year terms, with a limit of two successive four-year terms. The mayor serves as the presiding officer at official meetings and as the ceremonial head of the city. A vice mayor is elected annually by the city commission from among the commission members. The current mayor is Santiago Avila Jr, who was elected into office in November 2022.

No invocation is normally recited at the start of City Commission meetings. However, in June, 2017, the national group Americans United for Separation of Church and State, acting on behalf of a Deltona resident, contacted the city's attorneys to advise them that the reading of passages from the Bible by City Commissioner Christopher Alcantara allegedly violates the Establishment Clause of the First Amendment of the United States Constitution. The city responded that “engaging in the recitation of Biblical verse during a public meeting is not in and of itself enough for an Establishment Clause violation.”

Citywide public bus transportation and paratransit service is provided by Votran, a public transit service governed by the County of Volusia. SunRail provides commuter rail service to the Orlando area in the neighboring city of DeBary via Votran feeder bus service to the DeBary station, and a 275-space park and ride. Deltona's only limited-access highway is Interstate 4, and traverses through the city's western boundary. Other major highways include Florida State Road 472, which terminates near the city limit in northwestern Deltona at Howland Boulevard, and Florida State Road 415, which traverses through the city's southeastern boundary.

The city's water supply and wastewater management is overseen by Deltona Water, a division of the City of Deltona's Public Works Department, with some areas managed by the Volusia County Water Resources and Utilities division. Its main water supply comes from the Floridan aquifer system, one of the most productive aquifers in the world. Commercial solid waste (trash and garbage collection), and yard waste services are offered through Waste Pro. Natural gas is provided by Florida Public Utilities. Electric power service is provided by Florida Power & Light and Duke Energy. Wired telephone service is provided by AT&T and CenturyLink. Cable television is provided by Spectrum.

Economy 
, 60.0% of the population aged 16 years and over was in the labor force, with 52.7% employed and 7.2% unemployed. 32.4% of the population worked in sales and office occupations; 24.8% worked in management, business, science and arts occupations; 20.7% in service occupations; 11.5% in production, transportation, and material moving occupations; and 10.6% in natural resources, construction, and maintenance occupations. The industries for which the city's inhabitants worked were 20.0% educational, health, and social services; 15.4% retail trade; 10.7% professional, scientific, management, administrative and waste management services; 9.5% arts, entertainment, recreation, accommodation and food services; 7.7% manufacturing; 7.6% finance, insurance, real estate, and rental and leasing; 7.2% construction; 6.3% public administration; 5.1% transportation, warehousing and utilities; 4.5% other services (except public administration); 3.5% information; 2.2% wholesale trade; and 0.4% agriculture, forestry, fishing and hunting, and mining. 82.7% of workers worked in the private sector, 12.7% in government, and 4.6% self-employed in unincorporated businesses. 85.9% of the population commute to work by driving alone in own car, with 8.1% consisting of carpoolers, 3.3% worked from home, 0.5% walked to work, 0.4% used public transportation (excluding taxicab), and 1.7% used other means to travel to work. The average commute time for workers is 32 minutes.

Fitch, Moody's, and Standard & Poor's rated Deltona bonds as "AA-" between 2013 and 2014. Fitch attributed Deltona's small commercial sector to the city being a "largely residential and mostly built-out community", but did acknowledge the city's improving unemployment rate, dropping from a peak of 12% in 2010 to 6.4% in June 2014. , the largest employers in the city include Daytona State College, followed by Publix Supermarkets, and Walmart.

Education 
According to the 2010 American Community Survey, 14.2% of all adults over the age of 25 in Deltona have obtained a bachelor's degree, which was below the national average of 27.2% of adults over 25, and 84.7% of Deltona residents over the age of 25 have earned a high school diploma, as compared to the national average of 85.0%.
Deltona had approximately 11,877 students enrolled in its public schools in the 2012–2013 school year. Three private schools are located in the city, offering both primary and secondary education. Higher education is offered by Bethune-Cookman University and Daytona State College through satellite campuses located in the city.

Public primary and secondary education is handled by Volusia County Schools (VCS). VCS operates 2 high schools (Deltona High School and Pine Ridge High School), 3 middle schools (Galaxy, Heritage and Deltona Middle Schools) and 7 elementary schools within city limits. One elementary school is located in unincorporated Deltona, and four public schools in neighboring communities serve outer portions of the city. In 2010, the Florida Department of Education awarded all public elementary and middle schools in the city "A" or "B" grades based on their performance on the Florida Comprehensive Assessment Test. In 2013, both public high schools in the city received a "B."

Elementary schools
 Deltona Lakes Elementary School
 Discovery Elementary School
 Forest Lake Elementary School
 Friendship Elementary School
 Pride Elementary School
 Spirit Elementary School
 Sunrise Elementary School
 Timbercrest Elementary School
Middle schools
 Deltona Middle School
 Galaxy Middle School
 Heritage Middle School

High schools
 Deltona High School
 Pine Ridge High School
Private schools
 Deltona Adventist School
 Deltona Christian School
 Good Shepherd Academy
 Trinity Christian Academy
Additional public schools serving Deltona
 University High School (in Orange City)
 Enterprise Elementary School (in Enterprise)
 Osteen Elementary School (in Osteen)
 Volusia Pines Elementary School (in Lake Helen)

Footnotes

Media and culture 

Deltona is a part of the Orlando–Daytona Beach–Melbourne media market, which is the 33rd largest radio market and the eighteenth largest television market in the United States. Its primary daily newspapers are the Orlando Sentinel, The Daytona Beach News-Journal, and the West Volusia Beacon. The city is also served by El Sentinel, the Spanish-language counterpart of the Orlando Sentinel and the city run Deltona TV which live streams city commission meetings and original programing online.

The city has one public library, the Deltona Regional Library, a branch of the Volusia County Public Library system which consists of the main library, an environmental learning center, and a 1,000-seat outdoor amphitheater built for community gatherings and educational instruction. The  facility received a Silver Certification from the U.S. Green Building Council. The library is adjacent to the Lyonia Preserve, a 360-acre (146 ha) joint project between Volusia County's Land Acquisition & Management Division and the District School Board. The purpose of the project is to restore and maintain the area's endangered scrub habitat. The Lyonia Environmental Center, located at the library, serves to encourage discovery and exploration of Volusia County's ecosystems and foster community involvement in conservation efforts.

Notable people

 Chad Brown (born 1996), basketball player in the Israeli Basketball Premier League
 Montana DuRapau, former MLB pitcher for the Pittsburgh Pirates
 Paxton Lynch, Pittsburgh Steelers quarterback
 John Masiarcyzk Sr., former first and third mayor of Deltona
 Dennis Mulder, business owner and the former second mayor of Deltona
 David Santiago, Former city commissioner, vice mayor and current Florida State Representative representing the 27th district

References

External links 

 

 
Cities in Florida
Cities in Volusia County, Florida
Former census-designated places in Florida
Greater Orlando
Planned cities in the United States
Planned communities in Florida
Populated places established in 1962
Populated places on the St. Johns River